In enzymology, a trehalose 6-phosphate phosphorylase is an enzyme that catalyzes the chemical reaction

alpha,alpha-trehalose 6-phosphate + phosphate  glucose 6-phosphate + beta-D-glucose 1-phosphate

The two substrates of this enzyme are alpha,alpha'-trehalose 6-phosphate and phosphate. Its two products are glucose 6-phosphate and beta-D-glucose 1-phosphate.

This enzyme belongs to the family of glycosyltransferases, specifically the hexosyltransferases.  The systematic name of this enzyme class is alpha,alpha-trehalose 6-phosphate:phosphate beta-D-glucosyltransferase. This enzyme is also called trehalose 6-phosphate:phosphate beta-D-glucosyltransferase.

References

External links 
 

EC 2.4.1
Enzymes of unknown structure